Ruslan Basiev (born 20 June 1979) is a former Armenian and Russian Freestyle wrestler of Ossetian descent.

Biography
Ruslan Basiev was born on 20 June 1979. He took up freestyle wrestling in 1995 under the guidance of Aslan Gabaraev. Basiev won a bronze medal at the 2005 Russian Championships in Krasnodar. In 2006, he defected to the Armenian national freestyle wrestling team. That same year, Basiev won a bronze medal at the 2006 World Wrestling Championships in Guangzhou. He won a silver medal at the 2009 European Wrestling Championships in Vilnius. In 2010, he came in second place at the international tournament "Takhti Cup" in Isfahan. Basiev became an Armenian Champion in 2010 and 2011. He was unable to qualify for the 2012 Summer Olympics. In 2012, the head coach of the Armenian freestyle wrestling team Araik Baghdadyan thanked him for his performances in the national team and said that Ruslan will not compete for the national team anymore. Basiev returned to his native Dagestan.

References

External links
 Basiev, Ruslan (ARM)
 Les-Sports.info

1979 births
Living people
Ossetian people
Armenian male sport wrestlers
Russian male sport wrestlers
World Wrestling Championships medalists
European Wrestling Championships medalists
Sportspeople from Dagestan